Nephology (from the Greek word nephos for 'cloud') is the study of clouds and cloud formation. British meteorologist Luke Howard was a major researcher within this field, establishing a cloud classification system.

While this branch of meteorology still exists today, the term nephology, or nephologist is rarely used.  The term came into use at the end of the nineteenth century, and fell out of common use by the middle of the twentieth.
Recently, interest in nephology (if not the name) has surged as many meteorologists have begun to focus on the relationship between clouds and global warming which is a major source of uncertainty regarding "...estimates and interpretations of the Earth’s changing energy budget."

 Since the late 1990s, some have suggested that when high solar activity lowers levels of cosmic rays, that in turn reduces cloud cover and warms the planet. Others say that there is no statistical evidence for such an effect. 

Some nephologists believe that an increase in global temperature could decrease the thickness and brightness (ability to reflect light energy), which would further increase global temperature.  Recently research has been going on at CERN's CLOUD facility to study the effects of the solar cycle and cosmic rays on cloud formation.

Notes

External links 

 A., C. (April 1906). The Nephological Review from Volume 34, Issue 4 of Monthly Weather Review, published by the American Meteorological Society. Archived from the original on April 29, 2017. Retrieved on March 25, 2007.

 Time lapse video of clouds forming over water

Cloud and fog physics
Effects of climate change
Branches of meteorology